Cheiropachus is a genus of insects belonging to the family Pteromalidae.

The genus was first described by Westwood in 1829.

The species of this genus are found in Europe and North America.

Species
The following species are recognised in the genus Cheiropachus:
 Cheiropachus arizonensis (Ashmead, 1904)
 Cheiropachus brunneri Crawford, 1912
 Cheiropachus cavicapitis Yang, 1996
 Cheiropachus juglandis Yang, 1996
 Cheiropachus mai Xiao & Huang, 2001
 Cheiropachus obscuripes Brues, 1910
 Cheiropachus quadrum (Fabricius, 1787)
 Cheiropachus scolyti (Ashmead, 1894)
 Cheiropachus tripunctatus (Geoffroy, 1785)
 Cheiropachus vimineus Xiao & Huang, 2001

References

Pteromalidae
Hymenoptera genera